The Traditional Wushu Federation of Armenia, is the regulating body of wushu in Armenia, governed by the Armenian Olympic Committee. The headquarters of the federation is located in Yerevan.

History
As a sport, Wushu has been developed in Armenia since the early 1970's. The Traditional Wushu Federation was established in 1992. Rustam Alaverdyan is the current president. The Federation oversees the training of wushu specialists and organizes Armenia's participation in European and international level Wushu competitions, including the European Wushu Championships and the World Junior Wushu Championships. The Federation is a member of the International Wushu Federation and the European Wushu Federation.

Activities
In 2001, the 6th annual World Wushu Championships were held in Yerevan, Armenia. 

The Federation organizes various Wushu tournaments throughout the country.

See also 
 Sport in Armenia

References

External links 
 Traditional Wushu Federation of Armenia official website
 Traditional Wushu Federation of Armenia on Facebook

Sports governing bodies in Armenia
Wushu in Armenia
Wushu governing bodies